Utkal Grameen Bank (UGB)  is a Regional Rural Bank established on 1 November 2012 with the merger of Rushikulya Gramya Bank and Utkal Gramya Bank in terms of provisions of Regional Rural Banks Act 1976. The bank is sponsored by State Bank of India & is jointly Owned by the Government of India, Government of Odisha and SBI.It is under the ownership of Ministry of Finance , Government of India.

The shareholders of the Bank are Govt. of India (50%), State Bank of India (35%) and Govt. of Odisha (15%). The Bank is operating in 17 districts of Odisha State with its Head Office at Bolangir. Besides, the bank has seven Regional Offices in western and southern Odisha.

History
The bank was established on 1 November 2012 as an amalgamation of the Rushikulya and Utkal RRBs. At the time of amalgamation, Rushikulya bank had only 87 branches. It subsequently grew to a network of 442 branches, of which 360 are in remote rural areas. Apart from the head office at Bolangir, the bank has opened regional offices at Sambalpur, Rayagada, Phulbani, Bolangir, Bargarh, Bhawanipatna, Jeypore and Berhampur.

Presently, the Bank operates in 17 districts of Western and Southern Odisha, covering 63% of the geographical area and 48% of the total population of Odisha State.

Performance
The bank made a profit of Rs 9.01 Crore in the year 2011–12. The bank had a credit-deposit ratio of 59.5% at the time of amalgamation.

In 2015, Utkal Grameen Bank came First in the ranking of all banks in Odisha on Financial Inclusion parameters, with a score of 75 out of 100, becoming the best bank to handle Government business in the State.

Board of directors
The bank's affairs are conducted by a Board of Directors consisting of the following persons :-

 Sri Alekha Chandra Beura, Chairman
 Sri Tarakanta bhakta, Deputy Secretary, Finance Department, Govt of Odisha
 Sri Nirmal Chandra Pattnaik, DGM, RBI
 Sri V Balasubramani, DGM, NABARD
 Sri Dhruba Charan Bal, DGM, SBI
 Sri Sanjay Tiwary, DGM, SBI

See also

 Banking in India
 List of banks in India
 Reserve Bank of India
 Regional Rural Bank
 Indian Financial System Code
 List of largest banks
 List of companies of India
 Make in India
 Odisha Gramya Bank

References

Regional rural banks of India
Banks established in 1976
Economy of Odisha